William Asa Hutchinson II (AY-sə; born December 3, 1950) is an American attorney, businessman, and politician who served as the 46th governor of Arkansas from 2015 to 2023. A member of the Republican Party, he was the U.S. attorney for the Fort Smith-based Western District of Arkansas from 1982 to 1985, U.S. representative for Arkansas's 3rd congressional district from 1997 to 2001, administrator of the U.S. Drug Enforcement Administration from 2001 to 2003, and the first undersecretary for border and transportation security at the United States Department of Homeland Security from 2003 to 2005.

In 2006, Hutchinson was the Republican nominee for governor of Arkansas, but lost to Democratic nominee Mike Beebe, the outgoing state attorney general. In 2014, Hutchinson was again the Republican nominee for governor, this time defeating the Democratic nominee, U.S. Representative Mike Ross. He was reelected in 2018 with nearly two-thirds of the vote. Hutchinson became barred by term limits from seeking reelection as governor in 2022 and beyond.

From 2020 to 2021, Hutchinson served as vice chair of the National Governors Association. He succeeded Governor Andrew Cuomo of New York as chair of the organization for 2021–2022.

Early life and legal career
Hutchinson was born in Bentonville, Arkansas, the son of Coral Virginia (Mount) Hutchinson (1912–1998) and John Malcolm Hutchinson Sr. (1907–1991). He earned his bachelor's degree in accounting from Bob Jones University in South Carolina in 1972 and received his J.D. from the University of Arkansas School of Law in 1975. He practiced law in Fort Smith for 21 years and handled more than 100 jury trials.

In 1982, President Ronald Reagan appointed Hutchinson U.S. Attorney for the Western District of Arkansas. At age 31, Hutchinson was the nation's youngest U.S. Attorney. He made national headlines after successfully prosecuting The Covenant, The Sword, and The Arm of the Lord (CSA), a white supremacist organization founded by polygamist James Ellison. The CSA forced a three-day armed standoff with local, state, and federal law enforcement. As U.S. Attorney, Hutchinson put on a flak jacket and personally negotiated a peaceful conclusion to the standoff.

Business career
In early 2005, Hutchinson founded a consulting firm, Hutchinson Group, LLC, with partners Betty Guhman and Kirk Tompkins, in Little Rock, and accepted a contract for a one-year position with Venable LLP in Washington, D.C., as the chair of its Homeland Security practice. Hutchinson ended his contract with Venable LLP in March 2006 to focus on his gubernatorial campaign and his consulting firm in Little Rock. In January 2007, Hutchinson rejoined Venable.

In June 2006, the Arkansas Democrat-Gazette reported that Hutchinson's $2,800 investment in Fortress America Acquisition Corporation, a company that Hutchinson was advising, was worth over $1 million after the company's initial public offering. The news story noted that Hutchinson was unable to touch his stock for another two years. The six founding shareholders in Fortress America, in addition to Hutchinson, included former U.S. Representative Tom McMillen, former U.S. Senator Don Nickles, and a private-equity firm that had former CIA Director James Woolsey among its partners.

On May 4, 2006, Hutchinson had filed a financial disclosure form he was required to submit as a candidate for governor. The form did not list his 200,000 shares in Fortress America, which were trading at about $5 per share. "Just totally an oversight", Hutchinson said when questioned by the media in June. He filed an amended report the next day to correct the error.

Political career

Early efforts
In 1986, Hutchinson ran against incumbent Democratic U.S. senator and former governor Dale Bumpers. It was a good year for Democrats, and Hutchinson fared worse than Bumpers's previous Senate challenger, Little Rock investment banker William P. "Bill" Clark.

In 1990, Hutchinson ran against Winston Bryant for attorney general of Arkansas; he lost a close race. Hutchinson then became co-chair, with Sheffield Nelson, of the Arkansas Republican Party, a position he held from 1991 through 1995, the last four years as full chair. He considered a rematch with Bumpers in 1992 before deferring to Mike Huckabee, who lost to Bumpers.

U.S. House of Representatives

In 1992 Hutchinson's brother, Tim, was elected to Congress in Arkansas's third congressional district, when veteran U.S. Representative John Paul Hammerschmidt retired. In 1996, when his brother decided not to run for a third term in the House in order to seek the open Senate seat caused by the retirement of David Pryor, Hutchinson ran for the seat and won.

Hutchinson, who had at first decided to run for an open seat in the Arkansas House of Representatives from Sebastian County, defeated Ann Henry, a longtime friend of Bill and Hillary Clinton, in November 1996. Although Henry outspent Hutchinson during the campaign, the district's heavy Republican tilt and his brother Tim's presence atop the ballot helped Asa win with 52% of the vote. Tim Hutchinson also won his campaign for the U.S. Senate and served one term, losing his reelection bid in 2002.

In 1998, Hutchinson was reelected to the House with far less difficulty, taking 80% of the vote against an underfunded Democratic challenger. He was reelected unopposed in 2000.

Hutchinson served as a house manager (prosecutor) in the impeachment trial of Bill Clinton.

In office, Hutchinson compiled a voting record as conservative as his brother's. He led efforts to crack down on illegal drugs, particularly methamphetamine. Hutchinson also served as one of the managers of the impeachment trial of President Bill Clinton in 1998. In 1999, Hutchinson was involved in the effort to reform campaign finance laws and offered an alternative proposal to the bill by Christopher Shays and Marty Meehan, which he opposed on the grounds that it "went too far" by attempting to ban television commercials by legal third-party organizations. Hutchinson did support John McCain's and Russ Feingold's Senate bill.

Hutchinson unsuccessfully tried to modify the civil asset forfeiture reform bill that sought to prevent police abuse of its power to seize private property on mere suspicion of being linked to any criminal investigation. His amendment would allegedly have empowered the police to continue profiting from drug money.

Drug Enforcement Administration

In 2001, at the beginning of the George W. Bush administration, Hutchinson was appointed Administrator of the Drug Enforcement Administration (DEA). He was confirmed by a 98–1 Senate vote.

Department of Homeland Security
After the September 11 attacks, Congress created the Department of Homeland Security (DHS). President Bush tapped Hutchinson to lead the Border and Transportation Security Directorate, a division of the DHS. The Senate confirmed Hutchinson by unanimous consent on January 23, 2003. Hutchinson left office as Undersecretary on March 1, 2005.

Other
Hutchinson agreed to serve on The Constitution Project's Guantanamo Task Force in December 2010. He told the Associated Press he agreed to join the task force because he believed it was "something important for our national security and our war on terrorism."

In the wake of the shooting at Sandy Hook Elementary School, the National Rifle Association (NRA) assembled a task force of experts in homeland security, law enforcement training, and school safety to review school security standards in select areas of the country. The task force's stated goal was to produce a comprehensive plan to address the safety of children in schools and to prevent such shootings in the future. Hutchinson led the task force. On April 2, 2013, he presented the National School Shield plan during a news conference at the National Press Club.

In May 2022, Hutchinson said he would consider running for president in 2024 even if Donald Trump ran again and that Trump's candidacy would not be a factor in his decision. He added, "I think he did a lot of good things for our country, but we need to go a different direction."

Governor of Arkansas

2006 election

Shortly after returning to Arkansas, Hutchinson announced his candidacy for governor in 2006. Initially, he was to face three-term Lieutenant Governor Winthrop Paul Rockefeller, who was favored in most pre-election polls, in the Republican primary. But Rockefeller's withdrawal and death from a blood disorder in early 2006 led to Hutchinson winning the primary. In the general election, he lost to the Democratic nominee, then-Arkansas Attorney General Mike Beebe.

2014 election

Hutchinson was the Republican nominee for governor of Arkansas in 2014. He was supported by House Speaker Davy Carter. On November 4, 2014, after defeating Tea Party-backed Curtis Coleman in the Republican primary, he defeated the Democratic nominee, Mike Ross, in the general election with 55% of the vote, the best showing for a Republican in an open-seat gubernatorial race since the end of Reconstruction. His victory also gave the GOP complete control of state government for the first time since the end of Reconstruction.

2018 election

Hutchinson was reelected on November 6, 2018, in a landslide, taking over 65% of the vote and carrying all but eight counties. In a bad year for the GOP nationally, Hutchinson garnered the largest margin of victory for a Republican candidate in Arkansas history.

Tenure

Hutchinson took office as governor on January 13, 2015.

On November 16, 2015, Hutchinson said that he would block all Syrian refugees from entering the state in response to the November 2015 Paris attacks.

Under Hutchinson, Arkansas resumed executions in 2017 after having executed no one since 2005. In 2021, DNA testing on the murder weapon and a bloody shirt at the scene of the crime did not match Ledell Lee, who was convicted and executed for murder. Hutchinson defended Lee's execution, saying, "the DNA findings released today do not present any conclusive evidence to undermine [Lee's guilty verdict]."

As governor, Hutchinson implemented work requirements for Medicaid enrollees. As a result, by December 2018, almost 17,000 Arkansans had lost their Medicaid health insurance, with reapplication available in the new calendar year.

In February 2019, Hutchinson signed a bill into law that would criminalize abortion in the event Roe v. Wade is overturned. On March 9, 2021, he signed SB6, a near-total abortion bill, into law. He said that the bill was intended "to set the stage for the Supreme Court overturning current case law. I would have preferred the legislation to include the exceptions for rape and incest, which has been my consistent view, and such exceptions would increase the chances for a review by the U.S. Supreme Court." On May 8, 2022, Hutchinson responded to comments by Senator Minority Leader Mitch McConnell about potential passage of a future federal law prohibiting abortions nationwide: "If the court reverses Roe v. Wade, they're saying that the Constitution does not provide that, which returns it to the states. And that's where the vigorous debate is going to be. That is where we're going to face a lot of concerns on the compassion side."

In 2015, Hutchinson signed into law legislation that would prohibit localities from extending civil rights protections to LGBT individuals. At the time, Arkansas was among states that allowed discrimination in the workplace, housing and business on the basis of gender identity and sexual orientation. In March 2021, Hutchinson signed into law legislation that would allow doctors to refuse non-emergency medical treatment to LGBT people based on moral objection. In April 2021, he vetoed a bill that would make it illegal for transgender minors to receive gender-affirming medication or surgery, calling it "a vast government overreach". The state legislature later overrode his veto.

In August 2021, Hutchinson signed bills into law that prohibited businesses and government facilities from requiring proof of COVID-19 vaccination for staff and customers to enter facilities. While Arkansas was experiencing a wave of COVID-19 cases, he also signed a bill into law that prohibited state and local officials from enacting mask mandates. He later said he regretted doing so. In December 2021, Hutchinson praised President Joe Biden's COVID policies and thanked Biden for his efforts to "get the vaccinations out" and "depoliticizing" the federal COVID response. In January 2022, Hutchinson encouraged large businesses to not comply with the Biden administration's vaccine requirements.

Hutchinson demanded that Republicans who tried to overturn the 2020 presidential election and spread Trump's "Big Lie" about the election not be put in positions of leadership. He also accused Trump of dividing the party and said his election conspiracies were "recipe for disaster". On February 5, 2022, Hutchinson and U.S. Senator Lisa Murkowski condemned the Republican National Committee's censure of Representatives Adam Kinzinger and Liz Cheney for their support of and participation on the House Select Committee tasked with investigating the January 6 United States Capitol attack.

Personal life
Hutchinson's older brother, Tim, preceded him as U.S. representative from Arkansas' 3rd congressional district and served as a U.S. senator from 1997 to 2003 before being defeated for reelection by then-Arkansas Attorney General Mark Pryor, a Democrat, in 2002. Asa and Tim Hutchinson are both graduates of Bob Jones University. Tim Hutchinson's identical twin sons, Jeremy and Timothy Chad Hutchinson, were the first twins to serve together in the Arkansas General Assembly, both as members of the House of Representatives. Asa Hutchinson is the brother-in-law of former Arkansas state Senator Kim Hendren, who in 1958 married his sister Marylea Hutchinson. Arkansas District 2 State Senator Jim Hendren of Sulphur Springs is Hutchinson's nephew. Hutchinson's son Asa Hutchinson III has been arrested multiple times for driving offenses, including arrests in 2023, 2019, 2018, and 2016 for DWI and an arrest for possession of a controlled substance at a music festival in 2016 and simultaneous possession of a controlled substance and a firearm in 2023. He has four children with his wife, Susan Burrell.

Electoral history

See also
 2020 coronavirus pandemic in Arkansas

References

External links

 Governor Asa Hutchinson official government site
 Asa Hutchinson on Getting Our Country Back on Track
 
 

|-

|-

|-

|-

|-

|-

|-

|-

|-

|-

|-

1950 births
20th-century American lawyers
20th-century American politicians
21st-century American politicians
Arkansas lawyers
Arkansas Republican state chairmen
Baptists from Arkansas
Bob Jones University alumni
Constitution Project
Drug Enforcement Administration Administrators
Republican Party governors of Arkansas
Hutchinson family
Living people
People from Bentonville, Arkansas
Politicians from Fort Smith, Arkansas
Republican Party members of the United States House of Representatives from Arkansas
United States Attorneys for the Western District of Arkansas
United States Department of Homeland Security officials
University of Arkansas people
Members of Congress who became lobbyists